USS S-28 (SS-133) was an S-class submarine of the United States Navy. A diesel submarine, she served in World War II during which sank one Japanese ship. She was lost at sea with all hands in July 1944.

Construction and commissioning
S-28′s keel was laid down on 16 April 1919 by the Bethlehem Shipbuilding Corporation's Fore River Shipyard in Quincy, Massachusetts. She was launched on 20 September 1922, sponsored by Mrs. William R. Monroe, and commissioned on 13 December 1923.

Service history

Inter-war period
Following shakedown exercises off the southern New England coast, S-28 moved south in March 1924 to join Submarine Division 11 in the final exercises of 1924's winter maneuvers in the Caribbean Sea. In April 1924 she returned to New London, Connecticut, with her division and commenced local exercises which occupied the remainder of 1924. In the winter of 1925, she moved south again, transited the Panama Canal, and, after the conclusion of Fleet Problem V, conducted in the vicinity of Guadalupe Island, she arrived in the Hawaiian Islands for a month's stay. In June 1924, she moved to San Diego, California, where her division replaced another division which had transferred to the United States Asiatic Fleet.

S-28 operated primarily off Southern California until 1931, calling at Mare Island Navy Yard in California for regularly scheduled overhaul periods and also deploying for a Fleet Problem in the Panama Canal area in 1926, for summer maneuvers near Hawaii in 1927, for a Fleet Problem in the Panama Canal area in 1929, and for summer maneuvers near Hawaii in 1930.

S=28 departed the United States West Coast for Hawaii in mid-February 1931, and on 23 February 1931 arrived at Pearl Harbor, Hawaii, from which she operated for the next  years. In mid-1939, she transferred back to San Diego, where she took part in training activities for the Underwater Sound Training School.

World War II
On 7 December 1941, S-28 – then a unit of Submarine Division 41 – was undergoing overhaul at Mare Island Navy Yard when the Japanese attack on Pearl Harbor brought the United States into World War II. On 22 January 1942, the work was completed, and she returned to San Diego, where she resumed her training activities for the Underwater Sound Training School. She continued that duty into the spring of 1942, then was ordered north to the Aleutian Islands to augment U.S. defenses in the Territory of Alaska.

On 20 May 1942, S-28, with other submarines of her division, departed San Diego. They stopped at Port Angeles, Washington on 25 May 1942, then continued on toward the newly established submarine base at Dutch Harbor, on Amaknak Island off Unalaska in the Aleutian Islands. On 29 May 1942, however, as the United States made preparations to minimize a two-pronged Japanese thrust against Midway Atoll in the Northwestern Hawaiian Islands and the Aleutians, the S-boats received orders to proceed to their patrol areas, bypassing Dutch Harbor.

First war patrol
During a quickly extinguished fire in her port main motor on the morning of 1 June 1942, S-28 suffered minor damage. That evening, she parted company with her sister ships and their escort, and on 2 June 1942 she entered her assigned patrol area and commenced patrolling the approaches to Cold Bay on the tip of the Alaskan Peninsula. On 3 June 1942, the Japanese bombed Dutch Harbor, opening the Aleutian Islands campaign, and, within the week, they had occupied Kiska and Attu in the Aleutians. On 12 June 1942, S-28 arrived at Dutch Harbor, refueled, took on provisions, and headed west to resume her war patrol.

On 15 June 1942, S-28 crossed the International Date Line, and on 17 June – after a two-day storm – she sighted Kiska and set a course to intercept Japanese shipping between there and Attu. On 18 June 1942, she fired on her first enemy target – an Imperial Japanese Navy destroyer – and the destroyer in turn counterattacked her. Eight hours later, sounds of the destroyer's search faded out to the south. S-28 had survived her first encounter with Japanese antisubmarine warfare forces.

Poor weather soon returned, and storms raged during 80% of S-28′s remaining time on station. On 28 June 1942, she moored in Dutch Harbor and commenced a refit.

Second war patrol
On 15 July 1942, S-28 got underway for her second war patrol and again headed for the Kiska area. On 18 July 1942, she reconnoitered Semisopochnoi, then moved on to Segula. Finding no signs of Japanese activity, she continued westward. On 20 July 1942 she was ordered to take station on an  circle from Sirius Point prior to sunrise on 22 July 1942, at which time a U.S. Navy task force was to bombard Japanese facilities on Kiska. The bombardment was delayed, delayed, and S-28 remained on that more distant station until 30 July 1942, when she was ordered back into the Kiska area. On 18 August 1942, having been unable to close any of the targets sighted during the latter part of her patrol, she returned to Dutch Harbor.

Third war patrol
On her third war patrol, which she conducted from 16 September to 10 October 1942, S-28 returned to the Kiska area. She operated to the north of the island until 25 October 1942, then, with the discovery of the Japanese development of Gertrude Cove on Vega Bay on the coast of Kiska, she shifted to the island's southern shore. On the night of 6–7 October 1942, she turned toward Unalaska, and on the morning of 10 October 1942, as she prepared to fire on an unidentified vessel, a ground in her fire control circuits caused an accidental firing of a torpedo from the No. 1 torpedo tube. That afternoon, she arrived at Dutch Harbor.

October–December 1942
From Dutch Harbor, S-28 headed to San Diego, which she reached on 23 October 1942. She provided training services for the West Coast Sound School and for the Amphibious Forces Training Group from 26 October to 13 November 1942. Then, during an overhaul, she received a fathometer, a Kleinschmidt distilling unit, and SJ radar. On 9 December 1942, she again headed north. On 16 December 1942, she reported by radio to Task Group 8.5 (TG 8.5), and on 21 December 1942 she arrived at Dutch Harbor.

Fourth war patrol
On 27 December 1942, S-28 departed Dutch Harbor on her fourth war patrol. On 3 January 1943, she crossed the International Date Line, and on 5 January 1943 she entered her assigned area in the northern Kuril Islands. Moving down the coast of Paramushiro, she patrolled in Onekotan Strait, then headed north again, and on 20 January 1943 passed Shumushu, from which she set a course for the Aleutians and returned to Dutch Harbor.

Fifth war patrol
During her fifth war patrol, which she conducted from 6 to 28 February 1943, S-28 remained in the western Aleutians, patrolling across the Attu-Buldir-Sirius Point route and along the coast of Attu, particularly off Holtz Bay, Chichagof Harbor, and Sarana Bay. Poor weather and her lack of speed, however, impeded her hunting.

March–June 1943
On her return to Dutch Harbor, S-28 was ordered south, and on 4 March 1943 she got underway for Esquimalt, British Columbia, Canada, where from 15 March to 15 April 1943 she conducted sound tests and antisubmarine warfare exercises with Royal Canadian Navy and Royal Canadian Air Force units. She then continued on to the Puget Sound Navy Yard in Bremerton, Washington, for overhaul and superstructure modification work. On 27 June 1943, she started back to Alaska.

Sixth war patrol
On 13 July 1943, S-28 departed Dutch Harbor to return to the northern Kuril Islands for her sixth war patrol. Again, she patrolled off Paramushiro and in the straits to its north and south. Again, she was hindered by the weather, her obsolete design, and by mechanical failures. On 14 August 1943, she headed for the Aleutians, and on 16 August 1943 she moored in Massacre Bay on the coast of Attu — retaken from the Japanese in the Battle of Attu in May 1943 — and commenced a refit.

Seventh war patrol
The late arrival of needed spares from Dutch Harbor delayed her readiness for sea, but on 8 September 1943, S-28 departed Attu to return to the northern Kuril Islands for her seventh and final war patrol. On 13 September 1943, she entered her patrol area. On 15 September 1943, severe smoking and sparking from her port main motor necessitated 14 hours of repair work. On 16 September 1943, she transited Mushiru Kaikyo, and, on the afternoon of 19 September 1943, she closed on an what she identified as an unescorted freighter off the island of Araito. Her torpedoes missed their mark. The supposed freighter was a warship, which turned and within minutes had delivered the first two depth charges of a 10-minute attack. The Japanese ship searched the area for an hour, then departed.

S-28 continued her patrol. At 19:16 on 19 September 1943, she contacted a second unescorted Japanese vessel. At 19:43, she fired a spread of four torpedoes. At 19:44, two of the four exploded. The target took on a 30° list and began to sink by the bow. At 19:46, the  converted gunboat  sank, bow first, her stern vertical in the air. Five loud underwater explosions followed her disappearance. S-28 went deep and rigged for a depth charging which did not materialize.

Into October 1943, S-28 hunted just north of Araito and off the coast of the Kamchatka Peninsula. On 5 October 1943, she moved through Onekotan Strait and continued her patrol on the Pacific side of the Kuril Islands. On 10 October 1943, however, a crewman developed severe appendicitis, and she headed for Attu one day ahead of schedule. On 13 October 1943, she moored at Attu. The next day, she departed for Dutch Harbor.

November 1943–July 1944
In November 1943, S-28 headed south to Hawaii. She arrived at Pearl Harbor in mid-November 1943, and – after overhaul – commenced training duty. For the next seven months, she remained in Hawaiian waters, providing training services.

Loss
On 3 July 1944, S-28 began anti-submarine warfare training operations off Oahu with the United States Coast Guard cutter . The anti-submarine warfare exercises continued into the evening of 4 July 1944. At 17:30, the day's concluding exercise began. Contact between the two vessels became sporadic and, at 18:20, Reliance made and lost her last, brief contact with S-28. All of Reliance′s further attempts to establish communications with S-28 failed.

Assistance arrived from Pearl Harbor, but a thorough search of the area failed to locate S-28 or her crew. Two days later, a slick of diesel fuel appeared in the area where she had been operating, but the extreme depth of the waters there exceeded the range of available rescue and salvage equipment. A court of inquiry was unable to determine the cause of the loss of S-28.

Discovery of wreck

Awards
 Asiatic-Pacific Campaign Medal with one battle star for World War II service

References

Footnotes

Bibliograohy
 
 Hinman, Charles R., and Douglas E. Campbell. The Submarine Has No Friends: Friendly Fire Incidents Involving U.S. Submarines During World War II. Syneca Research Group, Inc., 2019. .

External links
 On Eternal Patrol: USS S-28
 Kill record: USS S-28

United States S-class submarines
World War II submarines of the United States
Friendly fire incidents of World War II
Maritime incidents in June 1942
Maritime incidents in July 1944
United States submarine accidents
Shipwrecks of Hawaii
Lost submarines of the United States
Ships built in Quincy, Massachusetts
1922 ships
Ships lost with all hands
1944 in Hawaii
Ships of the Aleutian Islands campaign